Francis X. McLaughlin (March 18, 1935 – March 4, 2020) was an American comics artist who co-created the comic book character Judomaster, drew the comic strip Gil Thorp, and assisted on such strips as Brenda Starr, Reporter and The Heart of Juliet Jones. He also wrote and illustrated books about cartooning and comic art.

Biography

Early life and career
McLaughlin was born in Meriden, Connecticut, to Francis and Grace (Daly) McLaughlin, and raised in Stratford, Connecticut. He had three siblings: sister Maureen and brothers James and Michael. Growing up, McLaughlin was inspired by the work of such magazine illustrators as Coby Whitmore, Joe Bowler and Howard Terpning, as well as such earlier illustrators as Gustav Klimt and Alfons Mucha, and such comic-strip artists as Alex Raymond and Milton Caniff.

He studied art at the University of Bridgeport and the New Haven State Teachers College, both in Connecticut. McLaughlin's first professional art job, at "about 17," was drawing belt buckles for a Bridgeport manufacturer's catalog.

After college, McLaughlin, an avid baseball player, went to work for the brake manufacturer Raybestos, where he played for its internationally ranked fast-pitch softball team. After a year there, he was drafted into the U. S. Army, then returned to civilian life as a technical illustrator for Sikorsky Aircraft.

McLaughlin entered the comic book industry in the early 1960s. A college friend recommended him to editor Pat Masulli at Charlton Comics in Derby, Connecticut, who hired McLaughlin as his assistant. "There were no art directors or assistant editors or any other job titles", McLaughlin said in a 2000 interview. "[I did] everything from proofreading to art corrections, lettering titles for [editor] Ernie Hart's books, traffic managing, liaison with the Comics Code, and anything else, including cleaning the storeroom". He did occasional, uncredited inking on late comic books, including on "a couple" of stories by Steve Ditko.

Creator credits were not routinely given in comics during this era, and McLaughlin's earliest known probable credit is inking penciler Dick Giordano on the cover of, and a seven-page story in, Charlton's Battlefield Action #39 (Dec. 1961). McLaughlin's first confirmed credit is full pencil and ink art on the five-page story "And the Light Shall Come" in the same publisher's Reptisaurus #8 (Dec. 1962).

Giordano later became Charlton's editor after, McLaughlin said, he himself had turned down the job: "[Giordano] was a freelancer at the time, and then he hired me to work with him after I got through working at Charlton 9 to 5, and I'd go over to his studio, and then later on, we kind of swapped jobs, because there was a change at Charlton, and I think Pat [Masulli] was moving up, and they offered me his job. I opted to stay freelance and suggested Dick for the job. He became editor and I took over the studio," which artist Jon D'Agostino and writer Joe Gill would soon join.

Judomaster
McLaughlin, who became Charlton's art director by 1962, worked throughout the Charlton line, including on the superhero titles Blue Beetle, Captain Atom, and Son of Vulcan, the adventure comic The Fightin' 5, the supernatural/science-fiction anthologies Strange Suspense Stories and Mysteries of Unexplored Worlds, and the espionage comic Sarge Steel, where martial artist McLaughlin's backup features, "The Sport of Judo" and "What is Karate?," presaged the original character he would create with writer Joe Gill.

That character, Judomaster, debuted in Special War Series #4 (Nov. 1965), the final issue of that series, and continued in his own series, beginning with Judomaster #89 (June 1966), taking over the numbering of the defunct Western series Gunmaster. The series, which McLaughlin almost immediately began scripting as well, starred an American soldier in the South Pacific during World War II, who, after saving a native island girl from a Japanese sniper, was taught martial arts by her grateful grandfather. He acquired a costume based on the Japanese military flag, and, in issue #93 (Feb. 1967), a sidekick, Tiger. The series ended at #98 (Dec. 1967), and the character was later purchased by DC Comics in 1983, during Charlton's final years.

Marvel and DC
Following McLaughlin's final Charlton work, penciling the cover and both penciling and inking the seven-page story "The Living Legend" in the comic strip spin-off comic book The Phantom #30 (Feb. 1969), McLaughlin began to freelance. After a smattering of work that including inking an eight-page teen humor story in DC Comics' Debbi's Dates #10 (Nov. 1970) and a seven-page story in Warren Publishing's black-and-white horror-comics magazine Eerie #34 (July 1971), McLaughlin circa 1971 began assisting comic-strip artist Stan Drake on the naturalistic soap-opera strip The Heart of Juliet Jones. McLaughlin, at Giordano's suggestion, had shown samples of his work to the Westport, Connecticut-based Drake, who hired him to succeed assistant Tex Blaisdell, who had left to draw Little Orphan Annie. "I would pencil and ink just about everything that wasn't a main figure," McLaughlin said.

The following year, McLaughlin began to work steadily for industry leaders DC Comics and Marvel Comics. His first work for the former was inking  Win Mortimer on a Zatanna story in Adventure Comics #421 (July 1972), and his first for the latter was inking Jim Mooney on a romance comics story in Our Love Story #18 (Aug. 1972).

Settling into his career as an inker, McLaughlin became ensconced at Marvel, inking the likes of Wayne Boring on Captain Marvel and Sal Buscema on both Captain America and The Defenders before becoming primarily a DC inker. Throughout the 1970s, McLaughlin inked backup stories featuring the Atom, Black Lightning, Zatanna, and "The Fabulous World of Krypton", among others. He became the regular series inker for penciler Dick Dillin's Justice League of America, and for some issues of penciler Ernie Chan's Batman stories in Detective Comics, and Joe Staton's Green Lantern. Concurrently, he wrote martial-arts articles for Marvel's black-and-white comics magazine The Deadly Hands of Kung Fu.

In the 1980s McLaughlin was regular inker on penciler Carmine Infantino's The Flash, Gene Colan's Wonder Woman, and Dan Jurgens' Green Arrow, among other assignments. He also inked Steve Ditko on the first two issues of A.C.E. Comics' short-lived series What Is...The Face? (Dec. 1986 and April 1987), and for the same company wrote, co-penciled and co-inked the single issue of Big Edsel Band (Sept. 1987), starring the modern-day retro-1950s band. During the following decade, while continuing to draw for DC, McLaughlin expanded to Acclaim Comics and Broadway Comics. His last known comics work is Broadway's Fatale #6 (Oct. 1996), inking J. G. Jones.

Comic strips
Aside from his stint on The Heart of Juliet Jones in the early 1970s, McLaughlin also worked on such comic strips as Brenda Starr, Reporter, assisting Dale Messick; Nancy; and The World's Greatest Superheroes. From 2001, he took over the art for Jack Berrill's Tribune Media comic strip Gil Thorp, drawing the sports feature through 2008.

Teacher and author
McLaughlin has taught at the Paier College of Art in Hamden, Connecticut, and Guy Gilchrist's Cartoonist's  Academy in Simsbury, Connecticut. He co-developed the literacy program "Writing to Read" for the JHM Corporation through Nova University, in which comic-book storytelling was used to teach and encourage reading.

His books include How to Draw Those Bodacious Bad Babes of Comics (Renaissance Books, 2000) and How to Draw Monsters for Comics (Renaissance Books, 2001), both with Mike Gold.

Personal life
McLaughlin practiced judo from ages 18 to 50, initially studying at Joe Costa's Academy of Judo. He married at age 30, in 1965, living then in Derby, Connecticut, and working in a studio in nearby Ansonia before moving back to his home town of Stratford. As of 2000, he had two grown children: daughter Erin and son Terry. His brother James’ daughter, Anne McLaughlin, is also a professional artist.

McLaughlin died March 4, 2020, age 84, at Milford Hospital in Milford, Connecticut.

Bibliography

Archie Comics
 Steel Sterling #5 (1984)

Atlas/Seaboard Comics
 Planet of Vampires #1–2 (1975)

Broadway Comics
 Fatale #1–6 (1996)

Charlton Comics
 Blue Beetle #1 (1964)  
 Blue Beetle #50 (1965)  
 Captain Atom #88–89 (1967)  
 Judomaster #89–98 (1966–1967)
 Peter Cannon, Thunderbolt #53 (1966)  
 Son of Vulcan #49 (1965)  
 Special War Series #4 (1965)

DC Comics

 Action Comics #434–435, 465, 468, 486, 525, 531, 536, 538 (1974–1982)  
 Action Comics Weekly #619–630, 636–640 (1988–1989)  
 Adventure Comics #421, 459–461, 463, 489 (1972–1982)  
 Armageddon: Inferno #4 (1992)  
 Batman #248–250, 271, 273, 309, 311, 313–318, 326–329, 331–336, 338, 341–342, 507 (1973–1994)  
 Batman Family #6, 11 (1976–1977)  
 Batman: Shadow of the Bat #39 (1995)  
 The Brave and the Bold #103, 146 (1972–1979)  
 Captain Atom #20 (1988)  
 Danger Trail #1–4 (1993)  
 Date with Debbi #5–6 (1969)  
 DC Challenge #12 (1986)  
 DC Comics Presents #22, 25, 40–42, 44, 48, 51, 57, 64 (1980–1983)  
 DC Special Series #1 (The Flash) (1977)  
 DC Super Stars #10 (1976)  
 Debbi's Dates #10–11 (1970)  
 Demolition Man #1–4 (movie adaptation) (1993–1994)  
 Detective Comics #453, 460–464, 483–485, 490–491, 598–600 (1975–1989)
 The Flash #215–218, 221–222, 226–227, 229–232, 237–239, 241–249, 252–258, 262–270, 277, 325, 329–350 (1972–1985)
 The Flash vol. 2 #60–61 (1992)  
 Fly #13 (1992)  
 Ghosts #9, 27 (1972–1974)  
 Green Arrow vol. 2 #2–6, 9–24, 27–34, 97, Annual #2, 6 (1988–1995) 
 Green Lantern vol. 2 #121, 124–127, 129–130, 152, 166–168, 170 (1979–1983)
 Infinity, Inc. #49 (1988)  
 The Joker #7 (1976)
 Justice League of America #117–189, 226 (1975–1984)  
 Justice Society of America #4, 6 (1991)
 Kobra #5 (1976)  
 Lobo: A Contract on Gawd #3–4 (1994)  
 Ms. Tree Quarterly #8 (1992)  
 New Adventures of Superboy #24, 41–43 (1981–1983)  
 New Gods vol. 3 #26, 28 (1991)  
 Red Tornado #1–4 (1985)  
 Robin vol. 4 #15–15, Annual #2 (1993–1995) 
 Secret Origins Annual #2 (1988)
 The Shadow #9 (1975)  
 Strange Sports Stories #5 (1974)  
 Superman #263, 275, 369–370 (1973–1982)  
 The Superman Family #195–196, 212, 215 (1979–1982)  
 Superman IV Movie Special #1 (1987)  
 Tales of the Green Lantern Corps #1–3 (1981)  
 Teen Titans Spotlight #5–6 (1986–1987)  
 War of the Gods #4 (1991)  
 Weird War Tales #59 (1978)  
 Wonder Woman #291–305 (1982–1983)  
 Wonder Woman vol. 2 #19, 68 (1988–1992)  
 World of Metropolis #1 (1988)  
 World's Finest Comics #257, 269, 271, 275, 282–283, 295, 300 (1979–1984)

Marvel Comics

 Adventure into Fear #15 (1973) 
 Amazing Adventures #16, 19 (1973)  
 The Avengers #109 (1973)  
 Captain America #155–156, 160, 165–166, 169, 259–264 (1972–1981)  
 Captain Marvel #23 (1972)  
 Cat #4 (1973)  
 Chamber of Chills #6 (1973)  
 Creatures on the Loose #34–36 (1975)  
 Dazzler #6–7 (1981)  
 Deadly Hands of Kung Fu #3, 10, Special #1 (1974–1975)  
 Defenders #4–6, 8–9 (1973)  
 Giant-Size Dracula #2 (1974)  
 Hero for Hire #16 (1973)   
 Our Love Story #18 (1972)

Valiant Comics
 H.A.R.D. Corps #23 (1994)

References

External links
 
 Frank McLaughlin at Mike's Amazing World of Comics
 Frank McLaughlin at the Unofficial Handbook of Marvel Comics Creators

1935 births
2020 deaths
20th-century American artists
21st-century American artists
American art directors
American comics artists
American comic strip cartoonists
American art educators
Artists from Connecticut
Charlton Comics
Comics inkers
DC Comics people
Marvel Comics people
People from Stratford, Connecticut
Silver Age comics creators
Southern Connecticut State University alumni
United States Army soldiers
University of Bridgeport alumni